Mike Thomas is a British writer and former South Wales police officer. He is known for his 2010 book Pocket Notebook, which was longlisted for the Wales Book of the Year.

Bibliography 

Pocket Notebook (2010)
Ugly Bus (2014)

References

External links 
 

Living people
Welsh writers
1971 births
British police officers